Lower Benna Rural LLG is a local-level government (LLG) of Eastern Highlands Province, Papua New Guinea.

Wards
01. Siokie
02. Katagu
03. Ketarabo
04. Korofeigu
05. Magitu
06. Hofagaiufa
07. Conner Bena

References

Local-level governments of Eastern Highlands Province